The Nipissing-Parry Sound Catholic District School Board (known as English-language Separate District School Board No. 30B prior to 1999) administers separate school Catholic education for an area of  in central Ontario, Canada. Its headquarters are in North Bay.

Schools 
The board manages 11 elementary schools and one Student Success/St. Joseph Adult Education  one secondary school.

Elementary schools
 Holy cross 
 Mother St. Bride
 Our Lady of Fatima
 Our Lady of Sorrows
 St. Alexander
 St. Francis
 St. Gregory
 St. Hubert
 St. Luke
 St. Theresa
 St. Victor

Secondary school 
 St. Joseph-Scollard Hall (SJSH) was created in 1985 through the merger of Scollard Hall (boys) and St. Joseph/St. Mary's Academy (girls). The teachers today are mostly Catholic men and women, many of whom were former students of the schools.
 1 Student Success/St. Joseph Adult Education.

See also
List of school districts in Ontario
List of high schools in Ontario

References

Roman Catholic school districts in Ontario